Pussy is an English-language word used as slang, euphemism, and vulgarity. Common referents include:

 Cat
 Female genitalia
 Coward

Pussy may also refer to:

Arts and entertainment

Characters
 Big Pussy Bonpensiero, on the TV series The Sopranos
 Pussy Galore, in the James Bond novel and film Goldfinger

Music
 "Pussy" (Iggy Azalea song), 2011
 "Pussy" (Latto song), 2022
 "Pussy" (Lords of Acid song), 1998
 "Pussy" (Rammstein song), 2009
 "Pussy", a song by Alaska Thunderfuck from Anus, 2015
 "Pussy", a song by Bad Gyal from Warm Up, 2021
 "Pussy", a song by Dark Polo Gang and Tony Effe; an Italian number-one hit of 2020
 "Pussy", a song by Ty Dolla Sign from Campaign, 2016
 "Pussy", a song by Young Thug from So Much Fun, 2019
 "Pussy (Real Good)", a song by Jacki-O from Poe Little Rich Girl, 2004

People
 Jeanne-Justine Fouqueau de Pussy (1786–1863), French author
 Pussy Jones (1871–1940), Welsh rugby union player
 Pussy Tebeau (1870–1950), American baseball player
 Pussy Tourette (21st century), American drag queen

Other uses
 Pussy, Savoie, a village in the commune of La Léchère, Savoie département, France
 Pussy (energy drink), a British soft drink
 Pussy (horse) (1831–after 1848), a Thoroughbred racehorse that won the 1834 Epsom Oaks

See also
 
 
 Puss (disambiguation)
 Pussycat (disambiguation)